Paoli may refer to:

People
Antonio Paoli, a tenor singer from Puerto Rico
Amalia Paoli, a soprano singer from Puerto Rico
Pasquale Paoli, Corsican patriot and leader

Places
In the United States
Paoli, Colorado, town
Paoli, Georgia, unincorporated community
Paoli, Indiana, town
Paoli Township, Orange County, Indiana
Paoli, Oklahoma, town
Paoli, Pennsylvania, census-designated place
Paoli, Wisconsin, unincorporated community
Paoli (SEPTA station), commuter rail station in the suburbs of Philadelphia, Pennsylvania

Other uses
Paoli (surname)
Paoli, Inc., manufacturer of office furniture located in Orleans, Indiana and a subsidiary of HNI Corporation
Casa Paoli, the childhood home of Antonio Paoli
Battle of Paoli, in the American Revolutionary War
USNS Paoli (T-AO-157), a U.S. Navy fuel tanker
Plural of Paolo, an Italian coin